Un Día Lejano is the first double album by the Costa Rican music band Malpaís. It was released in 2009 by the Costa Rican music label "Papaya Records"

Track listing

CD 1

"Invocación" - 2:08
"Rosa de un Día" - 3:42
"Tierra Seca" - 4:05
"Mi Ciudad" - 4:05
"Canela y Miel" - 3:54
"Canta Mandolina" - 2:58
"Marimba Calypso" - 3:24
"Derechos de Autor" - 4:02
"Bolero yo?" - 4:11
"Alicia en la Habana" - 4:00
"Montuno Fantástico" - 3:49
"Hila y Reta" - 4:47
"Adán Cantaba" - 3:01

CD 2

"El Polaco" - 4:43
"El Marino y la Mulata" - 3:47
"Efecto Mariposa" - 4:38
"Pronóstico del Tiempo" - 3:08
"Amor, Invierno" - 2:21
"Calle Abajo" - 3:32
"Cimarrona Blues" - 1:43
"Tu Punto" - 3:24
"El Bazar de Urías" - 3:18
"Llanera" - 4:37
"Coplas del Aventurero" - 3:14
"Consejos de una Niña a una Mujer" - 3:45
"Objetos Perdidos" - 4:52

References

Malpaís (group) albums
Spanish-language albums
2009 albums